Grumio may refer to:

Grumio, a slave cook in the Cambridge Latin Course stories.
Grumio, the slave of Marcus and Stylax in the TV series Plebs
A comic figure in Shakespeare's The Taming of the Shrew
Grumio, a slave in the play Mostellaria by Plautus